The Popular Orthodox Rally or People's Orthodox Alarm (Greek: Λαϊκός Ορθόδοξος Συναγερμός, Laikós Orthódoxos Synagermós), often abbreviated to LAOS (ΛΑ.Ο.Σ.) as a reference to the Greek word for people, is a Greek right-wing populist political party. It was founded by journalist Georgios Karatzaferis in 2000, a few months after he was expelled from the centre-right New Democracy. Today, the party is led by Nikolaos Salavrakos.

In 2004, LAOS secured support from the Party of Hellenism and the Hellenic Women's Political Party. In 2005, LAOS absorbed the nationalist Hellenic Front. The youth branch of LAOS is the Youth of the Orthodox Rally (NEOS) (which is also a pun on the word for "youth" in Greek). The Popular Orthodox Rally was a member of the Europe of Freedom and Democracy (EFD) group in the European Parliament during the 7th European Parliament, and was a member of the Alliance of Independent Democrats in Europe Europarty until the AIDE's dissolution in 2008.

The party failed to reach the 3% threshold of the popular vote in the 2004 elections, with 2.2%; three months later it gained 4.12% of the vote and one seat in the 2004 European Parliamentary Elections. LAOS received 3.8% of the vote in the 2007 elections, electing 10 members of parliament. In 2009 LAOS managed to elect two representatives in the European Parliament, receiving 7.14% of the vote. After receiving 5.63% of the vote and electing 15 members of parliament in the 2009 elections, LAOS dropped below the 3% threshold in 2012 and failed to secure any seats in parliament. On 8 April 2016 LAOS joined the alliance National Unity. The party did not contest the 2019 elections.

Many of its most high profile members, such as Makis Voridis, Thanos Plevris and Adonis Georgiadis, have since joined New Democracy, all three becoming ministers in the Cabinet of Kyriakos Mitsotakis, in what has been described as a "LAOSification" of the latter. Prior to the 2023 Greek legislative election, the party's founder and long-time president, Georgios Karatzaferis, praised Mitsotakis, calling him "[the best politician of the century]".

Ideology
According to the Popular Orthodox Rally, "the demarcation of the political world into the Right Wing and the Left Wing is no longer relevant after the end of the Cold War. Nowadays, everyone in every aspect of his or her everyday life is either in favour or against Globalization". The party claims to consist of radically diverse groups that span the entire left-right political spectrum. Party president Karatzaferis, speaking on the 6th anniversary of the party's creation, stated "We are united in the only party that has in its ranks labourers and scientists, workers and the unemployed, leftists and rightists".

Karatzaferis has described the Popular Orthodox Rally as "a profoundly democratic party", consisting of everything from a "pre-dictatorship Right" to a merger of Left and Right to a "Popular Liberalism" in official party literature. He has also stated that he supports "patriotism and social solidarity, taking from all ideologies and personalities I like. I don't care if it's called communism, liberalism or socialism."

However, the Popular Orthodox Rally is often characterized by opposing politicians and in the media as "far-right", "populist", "radical right", "right-wing" and "nationalist". It has also been argued that its founding declaration (now withdrawn from the web) included antidemocratic, anti-parliamentary ideas, and the proposal that decisions should be taken by a council, which would include military officers and Church officials. The Popular Orthodox Rally began as a party with an Orthodox Christian religious identity, but also one with a radically nationalist political identity. Although it has since allegedly tried to 'moderate' the nationalist part of its appeal, with some of an extreme-nationalist or neo-fascist bent, such as Konstantinos Plevris, then leaving the party to join Patriotic Alliance or other fringe political organizations, more extreme-nationalists have recently once again joined its ranks and been elected to parliament. Of the ten Popular Orthodox Rally candidates who entered the parliament in 2007, four are considered to be part of the "nationalist bloc": Makis Voridis, "Thanos" Plevris, Adonis Georgiadis, and Kiriakos Velopoulos.

Amid the Greek government-debt crisis, the party supported the first bail-out in 2010 (the only parliamentary party apart from the governing PASOK), but thereafter voted against PASOK government on crucial votes, including the 29 June 2011 vote on austerity measures. After George Papandreou resigned in November 2011, LAOS participated along with PASOK and the ND in the government of national unity (the Papademos cabinet), but resigned from the government in February 2012 due to further austerity measures and amid declining popularity in polls. LAOS failed to win any seats in the 2012 Greece parliamentary election, which can be attributed to its previous indecisive position.

Platform

The main points of the Popular Orthodox Rally platform are as follows:

 No accession of Turkey to the European Union
 Ban immigration from outside the European Union and deport all illegal immigrants.
 Opposition to the European Constitution and the Lisbon Treaty
 A strict stance in the Macedonia naming dispute; no recognition of the Republic of Macedonia under any name that includes the term "Macedonia."
 Drastic tax cuts for both individuals and small businesses.

Election results

Hellenic Parliament

European Parliament

Local elections

Affiliated media
The weekly newspaper A1
ART television station
 The alpha1news.gr website.
 The APT radio station FM 90.6

See also
List of political parties in Greece

Notes

External links
 
 Greek Ministry of Internal Affairs – Greek Election Results accessed 10 October 2012.
 Official Representation in Germany for the state BADEN-WÜRTTEMBERG (in Greek, English and German) This page appears to be almost all Greek language with no apparent link to an English language website. - accessed 10 October 2012.

 
Christian democratic parties in Europe
Nationalist parties in Greece
Eastern Orthodox political parties
Political parties established in 2000
2000 establishments in Greece
Eurosceptic parties in Greece
Conservative parties in Greece
Eastern Orthodoxy and far-right politics
Social conservative parties
Right-wing populism in Greece
Right-wing populist parties
Right-wing parties in Europe